Apiose is a branched-chain sugar found as residues in galacturonans-type pectins; that occurs in parsley and many other plants. Apiose is a component of cell wall polysaccharides.

Apiose 1-reductase uses D-apiitol and NAD+ to produce apiitol-apiose, NADH, and H+.

Flavone apiosyltransferase uses UDP-apiose and 5,7,4'-trihydroxyflavone 7-O-β-D-glucoside to produce UDP, 5,7,4'-trihydroxyflavone (apigenin), and 7-O-β-D-apiosyl-(1->2)-β-apiitol-glucoside.

References

External links

Aldopentoses